Once Around the Sun is an album of classical music composed by Joby Talbot, released in 2005.

Genesis
British broadcaster Classic FM named Talbot as its first resident composer. During his residence, Talbot created one new piece of classical music every month, scored for up to five instruments. The compositions were premiered and playlisted on Classic FM. The twelve compositions form part of a larger piece that was released on compact disc as Once Around the Sun on 23 May 2005.

The CD also contains bonus tracks by Billiardman.

Track listing
 "January: A Yellow Disc Rising From The Sea"
 "February: The Arctic Circle"
 "March: Seed Capsule"
 "April: The First Day of Summer"
 "May: Cumulonimbus"
 "June: Transit of Venus"
 "July: Hovercraft"
 "August: Cloudpark"
 "September: The Last Day of Summer"
 "October: Cerberus"
 "November: Eleven"
 "December: Polarisation"

Bonus Tracks
 "Iliac Crest" (Billiardman)
 "Dead Space" (Billiardman)
 "Incubator" (Billiardman)

2005 albums